The Azawakh is a breed of dog from West Africa. With ancient origins, it is raised throughout the Sahelian zone of Mali, Niger,  and Burkina Faso.  This region  includes the Azawagh Valley for which the breed is named.  While commonly associated with the nomadic Tuareg people, they are also bred and owned by other ethnic groups such as the Peulh, Bella, and Hausa. The Azawakh is more related to the Sloughi than it is to the Saluki.

Description

Appearance
Slim and elegant, with bone structure and muscles showing through thin skin. Eyes are almond-shaped.

The coat is very short and almost absent on the belly. Its bone structure shows clearly through the skin and musculature. Its muscles are "dry", meaning that they  are quite flat, unlike the Greyhound and Whippet. In this respect it is similar in type to the Saluki.

Colours
Colours permitted by the Fédération Cynologique Internationale (FCI) breed standard are clear sand to dark fawn/brown, red and brindle (with or without a dark mask), with white bib, tail tip, and white on all feet (which can be tips of toes to high stockings). Since 2015 white stockings that go above the elbow joint are considered disqualifying features in the FCI member countries, as is a white collar or half collar (Irish marked).

Some conservationists support the idea that in Africa, Azawakhs are still found in a variety of colours such as red, blue fawn (that is, with a lilac cast), grizzle, and, rarely, blue and black with various white markings including Irish marked (white collar) and particolour (mostly white). Because of this wide color variation in the native population, the American standard used by the AKC and UKC allows any color combination found in Africa. (AKC and UKC are not a member of the FCI)

Movement

The Azawakh's light, supple, lissome gait is a notable breed characteristic, as is an upright double suspension gallop.

Health

Azawakhs are an incredibly sound coursing hound. There is a small occurrence of adult-onset idiopathic epilepsy in the breed. Wobbler disease, or cervical vertebral instability, does rarely occur.

Reproduction
Unassisted birth of healthy puppies is normal. Litter sizes are usually from four to six puppies, but litters as small as one and as large as ten occur.

Temperament
The austerity of the Sahel environment has ensured that only the most fit dogs survive and has accentuated the breed's ruggedness and independence. Unlike some other sighthounds, the Azawakh is more of a pack hunter and they bump down the quarry with hindquarters when it has been tired out. In role of a guard dog, if an Azawakh senses danger it will bark to alert the other members of the pack, and they will gather together as a pack under the lead of the alpha dog, then chase off or attack the predator. The Sloughi, by comparison, is more of an independent lone hunter and has a high hunting instinct.

Azawakhs have a range of temperaments from lap dog to quite fierce. Lifelong socialization and gentle handling are critical. Well socialised and trained, they can be good with other dogs, cats, children, and strangers.

Unlike other sighthounds, the primary function of the Azawakh in its native land is that of protector. It develops an intense bond with its owner, yet can perform independently from its master. With those they accept, Azawakh are gentle and extremely affectionate. With strangers many are reserved and prefer not to be touched, but are not inherently aggressive. Although raised to guard against predators, they do not have innate aggression toward canines or humans unless they are threatened.

Azawakh have high energy and tremendous endurance. They are excellent training companions for runners. Many Azawakh dislike rain and cold weather.

Azawakh are pack oriented and form complex social hierarchies. They have tremendous memories and are able to recognize each other after long periods of separation. They can often be found sleeping on top of each other for warmth and companionship.

Alberto Rossi: "To raise an Azawakh is like building a very fragile construction, which takes a lot of sensibility and can be destroyed from one minute to the next. But every minute it lasts, it fills you with great happiness. Every time I´m sitting in a chair or sofa at least one of my dogs tries to take a seat on my lap. The same happens to those of my guests which they love. In these moments they seem to be the image of calmness, gentleness, and trust. But one should not be deceived about this. In the deepest place of their soul resides something wild and native, and they will remind us about it with the first occasion and we should not forget, even for a moment, not to treat them like a normal dog."

Breed history

The breed is relatively uncommon in Europe and North America but there is a growing band of devotees. Azawakh may be registered with the FCI in the USA via the Federación Canófila de Puerto Rico (FCPR). European FCI clubs and the AKC recognize the FCPR as an acceptable registry. The AKC (not a member of the FCI) currently recognizes Azawakh as a Foundation Stock Service breed and they are eligible to participate in AKC-sanctioned Companion & Performance events. The breed will enter the AKC Miscellaneous Class on June 30, 2011. The American Azawakh Association (AAA). is the AKC Parent Club for the Azawakh. Azawakh may be registered with the UKC and ARBA. The breed is not yet registered by CKC. Azawakh are eligible for ASFA and AKC lure coursing and NOFCA open field coursing events.

See also
 Dogs portal
 List of dog breeds

References

External links

Rare Breed Network: The Azawakh
American Azawakh Association
Foundation Azawakhs and Other Imports from Africa

FCI breeds
Sighthounds
Tuareg
Dog breeds originating in Africa
Rare dog breeds
Breeds originating from Indigenous people